Mynie Gustav Peterman (5 March 1896 – 14 October 1971) was an American pediatrician known for formulating the classic ketogenic diet (CKD) to treat epilepsy in children.

Biography

Peterman was born in Merrill, Wisconsin. He was educated at Merrill Public School (1901–1909) and Merrill High School (1909–1913). He obtained his Sc.B. from the University of Wisconsin in 1918, A.M. from Washington University in St. Louis in 1919 and M.D. from Washington University School of Medicine in 1920. He was Assistant in Paediatrics at Mayo Clinic (1923–1925). He was Director of Paediatrics at Marquette University and Director of the Medical Laboratories of the Children's Hospital of Milwaukee (1925–1933). 

During 1924–1925, Peterman reported results from the Mayo Clinic on the effectiveness of the ketogenic diet to treat epilepsy in children. Peterman’s ketogenic diet was described as consisting of "one gram of protein per kilogram of body weight in children, 10–15 g of carbohydrate per day, and the remainder of the calories in fat". Peterman observed that excess ketosis could cause nausea and vomiting which could be relieved by his patients drinking orange juice. In 1925, Peterman reported that 95% of 37 young patients had improved seizure control on the ketogenic diet.

He was a consultant in paediatrics to the United States Public Health Service (1954–1964). Peterman was a member of the American Academy of Pediatrics and was a Vice-President of the American chapter of the International League Against Epilepsy.

Personal life

Peterman married Mildred Mackenzie on 29 September 1924, they had two children. He died on 14 October 1971 in Milwaukee.

Selected publications

The Ketogenic Diet in the Treatment of Epilepsy (1924)
The Ketogenic Diet in Epilepsy (1925)

References

1896 births
1971 deaths
20th-century American physicians
American medical writers
American pediatricians
Low-carbohydrate diet advocates
Marquette University faculty
Physicians of the Mayo Clinic
University of Wisconsin–Madison alumni
Washington University in St. Louis alumni
Washington University School of Medicine alumni